The Underground Railroad Bicycle Route is a 2,000-mile bicycle touring route from Mobile, Alabama, to Owen Sound, Ontario. It was developed by Adventure Cycling Association with the Center for Minority Health (now called the Center for Health Equity) at the University of Pittsburgh. The route was built to loosely follow the Underground Railroad, the network of paths that African American slaves used to escape to the Northern United States and Canada.

Route
The route begins on the shores of the Gulf Coast of the United States in Mobile, Alabama, where the last slave ship to bring slaves to the United States docked in 1860. Cyclists then follow the Drinking Gourd north, with stops to visit historic Underground Railroad sites like museums and safe houses. Since its development in 2007, the original route has been augmented by spurs to Pittsburgh, Pennsylvania and Cincinnati, Ohio, and an alternate route through Detroit, Michigan. The endpoint is Owen Sound, Ontario, "the Underground Railroad's most northerly safe haven."

Terrain
The route varies from flat farmlands and rolling hills in Alabama and Mississippi to steep climbs and descents in Tennessee, Kentucky, and Indiana. The route is mostly rural aside from the spurs into Pittsburgh and Cincinnati, and the alternate route through Detroit.

Areas visited
 Alabama
 Mississippi
 Tennessee
 Kentucky
 Indiana
 Ohio
 Pennsylvania
 New York
 Michigan
 Ontario

Historic sites

 John Rankin House
 John P. Parker House
 Ulysses S. Grant childhood home
 Whitehall Plantation Museum
 National Underground Railroad Freedom Center
 Slave Market in Mobile
 Africatown in Mobile
 Harriet Beecher Stowe House
 Oberlin Heritage Center
 Lenawee County Historical Museum
 Charles H. Wright Museum of African American History
 Historic First Congregational Church
 Gateway to Freedom Monument
 Tower of Freedom Underground Railroad Monument
 Buxton National Historic Site and Museum
 First Baptist Church Chatham
 Chatham-Kent Black Historical Society
 Uncle Tom's Cabin Historical Site/Josiah Henson House
 Wilberforce Settlement Plaque
 Grey Roots Museum and Archives
 BME Church
 Historic Second Baptist Church
 Elmwood Cemetery
 Carnegie Center for Art & History
 Farmington Historic House Museum
 Springboro Historic District including conductor homes of the Underground Railroad.

References

External links

2007 establishments in North America
Cycleways in North America
Cycleways in Canada
Cycleways in the United States
Transport infrastructure completed in 2007
Underground Railroad